The 2005 South African Figure Skating Championships were held in September 2004. Skaters competed in the disciplines of men's and ladies' singles at the senior, novice, and pre-novice levels. There was also a junior and juvenile ladies' competition.

Senior results

Men

Ladies

External links
 Results

South African Figure Skating Championships, 2005
South African Figure Skating Championships